The Østre Landsret (the Eastern High Court) is one of Denmark's two High Courts, along with the Vestre Landsret (Western High Court). Both High Courts function as a civil and criminal appellate court for cases from the subordinate courts and furthermore as a court of first instance in significant civil cases with issues of principle. 

The Østre Landsret sits in Copenhagen but has chambers in some Eastern towns and cities, such as Odense, used only for criminal cases. It has jurisdiction over all County Courts in Zealand, Funen, Lolland, Falster and Bornholm as well as the Faroe Islands. A municipal court decision can always be appealed to a High Court - if the disputed claim exceeds DKK 10.000. First instance civil cases may only be brought before the High Court if the disputed claim exceeds DKK 1.000.000.

The Østre Landsret has one President and 58 judges. Like the Vestre Landsret, it is split into chambers, each consisting of three High Court judges. Though the President of the High Court appoints a presiding judge for each chamber, all decisions are reached by a simple majority, in all types of cases.

Østre Landsret was established in 1919.

See also
 Courts of Denmark

References 

http://www.domstol.dk/OESTRELANDSRET/EHC/Pages/default.aspx

External links 
The High Court of Eastern Denmark

Courts in Denmark
1919 establishments in Denmark
Courts and tribunals established in 1919